Nhã Nam is a township in Tân Yên District, Bắc Giang Province, in northeastern Vietnam.

References

Populated places in Bắc Giang province
Communes of Bắc Giang province
Townships in Vietnam